This article contains lists of achievements in major senior-level international rugby union, rugby sevens, rugby league and wheelchair rugby tournaments according to first-place, second-place and third-place results obtained by teams representing different nations. The objective is not to create combined medal tables; the focus is on listing the best positions achieved by teams in major international tournaments, ranking the nations according to the most number of podiums accomplished by teams of these nations.

Results 
For the making of these lists, results from following major international tournaments were consulted:

 IOC: International Olympic Committee
 IPC: International Paralympic Committee
 RLIF: Rugby League International Federation
 WR: World Rugby

Medals for the demonstration events are NOT counted. Medals earned by athletes from defunct National Olympic Committees (NOCs) and National Paralympic Committees (NPCs) or historical teams are NOT merged with the results achieved by their immediate successor states. The International Olympic Committee (IOC) and International Paralympic Committee (IPC) do NOT combine medals of these nations or teams.

The tables are pre-sorted by total number of first-place results, second-place results and third-place results, then most first-place results, second-place results, respectively. When equal ranks are given, nations are listed in alphabetical order.

Rugby union, rugby sevens, rugby league and wheelchair rugby 

*Defunct National Olympic Committees (NOCs) and National Paralympic Committees (NPCs) or historical teams are shown in italic.
†Non International Olympic Committee (IOC) members.

Rugby union, rugby sevens and rugby league

Men and women 

*Defunct National Olympic Committees (NOCs) or historical teams are shown in italic.
†Non International Olympic Committee (IOC) members.

Men 

*Defunct National Olympic Committees (NOCs) or historical teams are shown in italic.
†Non International Olympic Committee (IOC) members.

Women 

†Non International Olympic Committee (IOC) members.

Rugby union and rugby sevens

Men and women 

*Defunct National Olympic Committees (NOCs) or historical teams are shown in italic.
†Non International Olympic Committee (IOC) members.

Men 

*Defunct National Olympic Committees (NOCs) or historical teams are shown in italic.
†Non International Olympic Committee (IOC) members.

Women 

†Non International Olympic Committee (IOC) members.

Rugby union 

*Defunct National Olympic Committees (NOCs) or historical teams are shown in italic.
†Non International Olympic Committee (IOC) members.

Rugby seven

Men and women 

†Non International Olympic Committee (IOC) members.

Men 

†Non International Olympic Committee (IOC) members.

Women 

†Non International Olympic Committee (IOC) members.

Rugby league 

†Non International Olympic Committee (IOC) members.

Wheelchair rugby 

†Non International Paralympic Committee (IPC) members.

See also 
 World Rugby Rankings
 RLIF World Rankings
 Major achievements in Olympic team ball sports by nation
 List of major achievements in sports by nation

References

General 
Official results
 Rugby Union
 Olympic tournament: Rugby at the Olympics
 World Cup: Rugby World Cup
 Women's Rugby World Cup: Women's Rugby World Cup
 Rugby sevens
 Olympic tournament: Olympics
 World Cup: World Cup
 Rugby league
 World Cup: World Cup
 Wheelchair rugby
 Paralympics tournament: Results, Result Books

Specific

External links 
 World Rugby (WR) – official website
 Rugby League International Federation (RLIF) – official website
 International Wheelchair Rugby Federation (IWRF) – official website

Rugby
Achievements
Achievements
Achievements
Achievements
Achievements